Robert Bourke, 1st Baron Connemara,  (11 June 1827 – 3 September 1902) was a British Conservative politician and colonial administrator who served as Under-Secretary of State for Foreign Affairs (1874–80, 1885–86) and Governor of Madras (1886–90).

Background and education
Bourke was born into an Anglo-Irish aristocratic family at Hayes, County Meath, Ireland, the third son of Robert Bourke, 5th Earl of Mayo (the son of Hon. Richard Burke, Bishop of Waterford and Lismore), and Anne Charlotte, daughter of The Hon. John Jocelyn. His older brother was The 6th Earl of Mayo, a Viceroy of India. He was educated at Hall Place School, Bexley, Kent, and Trinity College, Dublin,  and was called to the Bar, Inner Temple, in 1852.

Political career
Bourke practised as a barrister for a number of years before being elected Conservative Member of Parliament for King's Lynn in 1868. In 1874 he became Under-Secretary of State for Foreign Affairs in Benjamin Disraeli's second administration, a post he held until 1880, when he was also sworn of the Privy Council. He held the same post from 1885 to 1886 in Lord Salisbury's first administration.

Governor of Madras 

In 1886, Bourke was appointed Governor of Madras. The following year he was appointed a Knight Grand Commander of the Order of the Indian Empire and raised to the peerage as Baron Connemara, of Connemara in the County of Galway. In 1890 he laid the foundations stone of the Connemara Public Library in Madras, which was named after him and opened six years later. The building was originally planned to house the proposed Victoria Technical Institute which was constructed in 1887, the Golden Jubilee year of Queen Victoria's reign. The third session of the Indian National Congress was held at Madras in 1887 when Lord Connemara was the governor. He hosted a garden party at Government House for the delegates. The construction of the Madras High Court was commenced in 1889.

Lord Connemara is credited with introducing a number of reforms while serving as governor. He personally supervised the famine-relief measures at Ganjam and reorganised the sanitary administration of Madras city. He also improved and extended the east coast railway line connecting Madras with Calcutta. The Madras Mail, in its 4 December 1890 issue, comments that his administration was "a bright epoch in the annals of Madras". He resigned as governor on 8 November 1890 and returned to Great Britain when his wife sued him for infecting her with syphilis and his adultery with her lady's maid. He did not defend himself and accepted the verdict and paid costs.

Later life 

Lord Connemara contributed occasionally in the House of Lords, mostly on matters dealing with foreign affairs, making his last speech in June 1898. He also published the work Parliamentary Precedents.

Family
Lord Connemara was twice married. He married firstly Lady Susan Georgiana, daughter of The 1st Marquess of Dalhousie, a former Governor-General of India, in 1863. They divorced in 1890. In 1894, he married Gertrude, former wife of Edward Coleman. Both marriages were childless. His second wife died in November 1898. Lord Connemara died in London in September 1902, aged 75, and was buried in the city's Kensal Green Cemetery. His barony became extinct at his death.

Arms

References

External links
Portrait of Lord Connemara at connemarapubliclibrarychennai.com

External links 
 

1827 births
1902 deaths
Politicians from County Mayo
Politicians from County Meath
Bourke, Robert
Irish knights
Barons in the Peerage of the United Kingdom
Knights Grand Commander of the Order of the Indian Empire
British barristers
Members of the Privy Council of the United Kingdom
Bourke, Robert
Bourke, Robert
Bourke, Robert
Bourke, Robert
Bourke, Robert
UK MPs who were granted peerages
Burials at Kensal Green Cemetery
Robert
Peers of the United Kingdom created by Queen Victoria
Alumni of Trinity College Dublin